Mike Penn (born 7 August 1989) is an English rugby union player for Moseley, having joined for the 2013-14 season from Edinburgh. He plays as a fullback or wing.

His former club is Worcester Warriors, whom he left in 2012. In May 2012, Penn signed a one-year contract with Edinburgh. 

Penn was educated at Bromsgrove School in England. His elder brother Russell was a professional association football player and later a coach.

References

External links
Worcester Warriors profile

1989 births
Living people
Moseley Rugby Football Club players
Worcester Warriors players
People educated at Bromsgrove School
Edinburgh Rugby players
Rugby union wings
Rugby union fullbacks
Birmingham & Solihull R.F.C. players
Nottingham R.F.C. players
Sportspeople from the West Midlands (county)